Leah Lynn Gabriela Fortune (born 13 December 1990) is a Brazilian football manager and former player. She has been a member of the Brazil women's national team. She has also played for the National Women's Soccer League (NWSL) club Orlando Pride.

Biography
She was born in São Paulo to American missionary parents and grew up in Illinois. She attended Wheaton Academy, graduating high school in 2009.

FIFA.com describes her as "one of the more unusual players" in the 2010 U-20 Women's World Cup, and describes her style of taking throw-ins as "a remarkable long throw, the prelude of which is a spectacular forward flip to help her launch the ball a long way into the area".
In November 2010, Leah was called up to the Brazil women's national football team. However, she tore her anterior cruciate ligament, leaving her out of football for months in recovery.

By virtue of her dual nationality, she could have had the opportunity to play at the senior international level for either Brazil or the United States.

References 

1990 births
Living people
Footballers from São Paulo
Brazilian women's footballers
Women's association football midfielders
Brazil women's international footballers
Brazilian football managers
Female association football managers
Women's association football managers
Brazilian people of American descent
People with acquired American citizenship
Soccer players from Chicago
American women's soccer players
Texas Longhorns women's soccer players
Lee Flames women's soccer players
Orlando Pride players
USL W-League (1995–2015) players
National Women's Soccer League players
American women's soccer coaches
USC Upstate Spartans women's soccer coaches
Lipscomb Bisons women's soccer coaches
Charlotte Lady Eagles players